Alikash is a village in Kamrup district of Assam, situated on the south bank of the Brahmaputra River. Nearby major towns are Boko, Bijoynagar and Chaygaon.

Transportation
Alikash is connected to nearby towns through National highway 17.

See also
 Alupati

References

Villages in Kamrup district